The Khavli barb or Indian maharaja barb (Puntius sahyadriensis) is a species of ray-finned fish in the genus Puntius. It is found in Maharashtra, India.

Reportedly, the scientific name of this species has been changed recently by a group of Indian ichthyologists. This species is now placed under the newly described genus Waikhomia, which is in the honour of ace Indian ichthyologist Vishwanath Waikhom. He has described over 100 species of fish from India. The new accepted scientific name for the species is Waikhomia sahyadriensis.

References 

Puntius
Fish described in 1953
Freshwater fish of India
Cyprinid fish of Asia